This is the list of Burundi cathedrals, sorted by denomination.

Roman Catholic 
Cathedrals of the Roman Catholic Church in Burundi:

 Cathedral of Christ the King in Bubanza
 Queen of the World Cathedral in Bujumbura
 Cathedral of Christ the King in Bururi
 Cathedral of Christ the King in Gitega
 Cathedral of Our Lady of Fatima in Muyinga
 Cathedral of Our Lady of Fatima in Ngozi
 Cathedral of St. Joseph in Rutana
 Cathedral of Ruyigi

See also
List of cathedrals
Christianity in Burundi

References

Burundi
Cathedrals
Cathedrals
Cathedrals